Doomben railway station is the terminal station of the Doomben line in Queensland, Australia. It serves the Brisbane suburb of Ascot adjacent to Doomben Racecourse.

History
The Pinkenba line opened on 1 April 1897 to Pinkenba. A station for Doomben Racecourse was opened in 1909 alongside the Nudgee Road level crossing, and in 1976 a new station named Whinstanes-Doomben opened slightly farther east; Whinstanes was the name of the industrial branch line that crosses Kingsford Smith Drive to the Hamilton Cold Stores.

The station was renamed Doomben when the line was electrified on 6 February 1988. All passenger services on the line were suspended on 27 September 1993 as part of a statewide rationalisation of the rail network with the closing or suspending of under-utilised or unprofitable rail lines. Trains continued to serve Doomben when major race events were held.

Passenger services resumed on 27 January 1998, with Doomben becoming the terminal station with bus connections to the other abandoned stations.

Services
Doomben is the terminus for all stops services to and from Roma Street, Park Road and Cleveland.

Services by platform

Transport links
Brisbane Transport operate two routes from Doomben station:
301 Toombul to Cultural Centre
303: to Myrtletown via Pinkenba

References

External links

Doomben station Queensland Rail
Doomben station Queensland's Railways on the Internet
[ Doomben station] TransLink travel information

Ascot, Queensland
Railway stations in Australia opened in 1976
Railway stations in Brisbane